Ross McInnes is a Scottish pool player. He was four times PPPO men's world champion of English 8-ball pool in 1996, 1998, 2000 and 2001. He won his first Scottish title in 1981 and by 2002 was nine times Scottish champion and had lifted more world and European titles than anyone else. He then went on to win multiple World Seniors and World Masters championships and retired from professional pool in 2018 on a high, being part of a winning Scottish Masters team.

Ross is now an organizer of events and promoter of the game. He has developed a quality table for blackball.

He is married to Michaela Tabb.

References

World champions in pool
Living people
Scottish pool players
Year of birth missing (living people)